GHO may refer to:

 Gho, a traditional garment worn by Bhutanese men
 .gho, a file extension used by Ghost
 Gharo railway station, in Pakistan
 Ghomara language
 Global Health Observatory
 Global HELP Organization
 Greater Hartford Open, now the Travelers Championship, an American golf tournament